The Royal Horseguards Hotel is a London hotel situated in the area of Whitehall. It is operated by Guoman Hotels, a subsidiary of Thistle Hotels.

History
 
The building is the centre section of Whitehall Court which was designed by Thomas Archer and A. Green and constructed as a block of luxury residential apartments in 1884. The building's construction was the centrepiece of an elaborate pyramid scheme for fraud by the Liberal MP and property developer Jabez Balfour, through the Liberator Building Society which he controlled. In 1892 the Society collapsed, leaving thousands of investors penniless. Instead of advancing money to home buyers, the Society had advanced money to property companies to buy properties owned by Balfour, at a high price. It achieved its listed building status due to its architecture, which is modelled on a French chateau.

The centre section of Whitehall Court was converted to a hotel in 1971 and acquired by Guoman Hotels in 2008. It underwent a £20 million refurbishment at that time.

Media appearances
The World Branding Awards was held at One Whitehall Place, the events building of the Royal Horseguards Hotel, in 2014.

Location
The hotel is in Central London, just off the Embankment and Whitehall and near Trafalgar Square. The nearest tube station is Embankment and the nearest railway station is Charing Cross.

References

External links
 The Royal Horseguards, London: Hotel Watch" The Telegraph, August 2009

Residential buildings completed in 1884
Hotels in the City of Westminster
Hotels established in 1971
Household Cavalry